NLCS can refer to different things:

 North London Collegiate School, a girls' school in North London
 The National League Championship Series, a series in the Major League Baseball playoffs
 The National Landscape Conservation System, a system of protected lands managed by the Bureau of Land Management
 The Northern Lights Community School, a charter school in Warba, Minnesota
NNLs may refer to
 Noctilucent Clouds

See also

 NLC (disambiguation)
 NCLS (disambiguation)